The 2010 NCAA Women's Division I Swimming and Diving Championships were contested at the 29th annual NCAA-sanctioned swim meet to determine the team and individual national champions of Division I women's collegiate swimming and diving in the United States. 

This year's events were hosted by Purdue University at the Boilermaker Aquatic Center in West Lafayette, Indiana.

For the first time since 1982, Florida topped the team standings, finishing a mere 2.5 points (382–379.5) ahead of Stanford. This was the Gators' second women's team title.

Team standings
Note: Top 10 only
(H) = Hosts
(DC) = Defending champions
Full results

See also
List of college swimming and diving teams

References

NCAA Division I Swimming And Diving Championships
NCAA Division I Swimming And Diving Championships
NCAA Division I Women's Swimming and Diving Championships